Immersion is a 2021 Chilean thriller film directed by Nicolás Postiglione and starring Alfredo Castro. The film is about a family sailing trip that takes an unexpected turn. The film had its world premiere at the 2021 Guadalajara International Film Festival.

Synopsis
On a remote, beautiful lake in Chile, a middle-class father, Ricardo, and his two daughters are sailing to visit the family’s vacation home, which is falling apart from years of neglect. As his daughters nap on deck in the mid-day sun, Ricardo sees a group of men on a small boat that seem to be in distress, and calling for help. Paranoid to a fault, he turns his sailboat in the other direction, but his daughters awaken and call him out for his lack of compassion. Shamed by his daughters, Ricardo returns to help the men, who board his sailboat. One of the men is now missing and feared drowned. A tense search ensues, in which an ugly fear festers between all parties, and circumstances are set in motion that cannot be reversed.

Cast
 Alfredo Castro – Ricardo
 Consuelo Carreño – Teresita
 Michael Silva – Walter
 Mariela Mignot  - Claudia
 Alex Quevedo -  Conrrado

Release 
Immersion had its world premiere at the 2021 Guadalajara International Film Festival, where it won best first feature, best director, and best cinematography.

References

External links
 
 

2021 films
2021 thriller films
2020s Spanish-language films
Chilean thriller films
Films set in Chile
Films shot in Chile
2020s Chilean films